Frakes may refer to:

 Frakes, Kentucky, unincorporated community in Bell County
 Mount Frakes, prominent mountain marking the highest elevation in the Crary Mountains in Marie Byrd Land
 Frakes Aviation, American aircraft manufacturer

People with the surname
 Frakes family:
 Frank Frakes (1860–1933), American pioneer rancher, grandfather of George and cousin of William and Laurence
 George E. Frakes (born 1932), American historian, father of Robert, grandson of Frank
 Robert Frakes (born 1962), American historian, son of George
 Lawrence A. Frakes (born 1930), American and Australian geologist and paleoclimatologist, cousin of Frank and William
 William Franklin Frakes (1858–1942), American rancher, naturalist, adventurer, and author, cousin of Frank and Laurence
 Bill Frakes, American photographer 
 Jerold Frakes, American literature historian
 Jonathan Frakes (born 1952), American actor and director
 Laura J. Frakes, American educator
 Randall Frakes, American film and science fiction writer